Junghwa Station is a station on the Seoul Subway Line 7.

The station is located in Junghwa-dong, Jungnang-gu, on a main arterial road running broadly north to south past the western flank of Bonghwasan (a mountain). Joong Rang (sometimes written Jungnang) Middle School and Junghwa High School are situated nearby.

Station layout

Railway stations opened in 1996
Seoul Metropolitan Subway stations
Metro stations in Jungnang District